The Sialkot cricket team was a cricket team from Sialkot in Pakistan that historically competed in domestic first-class competitions, winning the Quaid-e-Azam Trophy on two occasions. The team played their home matches at Jinnah Stadium in Sialkot.

In the shorter formats of the game, the team used the name Sialkot Stallions and have enjoyed greater success, winning six national Twenty20 titles. They also hold the record for the most consecutive wins in domestic Twenty20 cricket with 25.

Noted players to have represented Sialkot include Imran Nazir, Shoaib Malik, Naved-ul-Hasan and Mohammad Asif.

Honours

Quaid-e-Azam Trophy
2005–06
2008–09

National T20 Cup
2005–06
2006–07
2008–09
2009
2009–10
2011–12

Notable cricketers

References

External links
Sialkot Cricket Association at ESPN Cricinfo's official website
First-class matches played by Sialkot
 Sialkot Cricket News

Pakistani first-class cricket teams
Cricket in Sialkot